The Home Teachers is a 2004 comedy film written by John Moyer and directed by Kurt Hale. The Home Teachers is a comedy distributed by Halestorm Entertainment and intended for LDS audiences, or members of the Church of Jesus Christ of Latter-day Saints.

Plot

Greg Blazer is a slothful, lazy Latter-day Saint who loves football so much that he wears football jerseys under his church clothes. Much to his dismay, Greg's Sunday-football-watching plans are interrupted by Nelson Parker, a faithful, nerdy, stalwart Latter-day Saint who is Greg's new home teaching companion. Together, the two men set out to complete their assignment, beginning a journey of slapstick comedy and hijinks that includes Greg falling through a ceiling while wearing a wedding dress, dressing up like a deer, and accidentally dancing with a dead grandfather at his own funeral.

Background

After the successful distribution of two films intended for LDS audiences, Halestorm Entertainment made the decision to produce and distribute The Home Teachers, based on a script by John Moyer. The genesis of the film grew from a single idea. Moyer had the idea of Birkeland falling through a ceiling, and built a script around it. That scene developed into Birkeland, wearing a wedding dress, falling through the ceiling onto a fully set kitchen table, followed by a toilet. Moyer soon wrote many other scenes involving similar slapstick humor and developed them into a story.

Reception
The Home Teachers was a critical and box office disappointment.   Critics lambasted its use of slapstick humor and criticized what they perceived as a heavy-handed plot.  The film also suffered from direct comparisons to Tommy Boy, a successful 1995 film starring Chris Farley, and David Spade, and Planes, Trains & Automobiles, a 1987 film directed by John Hughes. Many critics felt that The Home Teachers borrowed too much from these films, a concern one professional critic referred to as "verging on comedic plagiarism".

The Home Teachers was the third film produced and distributed by Halestorm Entertainment. Halestorm's first two films, The Singles Ward and The R.M., grossed $1,250,798 and $1,111,615 at the box office, respectively. Such similar box office grosses indicated a trend for Halestorm releases. However, The Home Teachers, despite being produced and distributed by the same source, grossed $196,123 during its theatrical run.  It was less than 16% the gross of The Singles Ward and the lowest grossing LDS comedy of its time.

References

External links

2004 comedy films
2004 films
Mormon cinema
Halestorm Entertainment films
2000s English-language films